Firebase St. George (also known as LZ St. George or LZ Pierson) was a U.S. Army firebase located southeast of Pleiku in the Central Highlands of Vietnam.

History
St. George was located at the intersection of Route 14 (now Route 17) and Route 7B (now Route 25) approximately 20 km southeast of Camp Enari and 33 km southeast of Pleiku.

St. George was occupied by the 1st Battalion, 14th Infantry and 1st Battalion, 9th Artillery when it was assaulted by People's Army of Vietnam (PAVN) sappers on the early morning of 6 November 1969 resulting in 9 U.S. killed.

Other units based at St. George included:
10th Cavalry Regiment
15th Artillery
1st Battalion, 92nd Artillery

Current use
The base has been turned over to housing.

References

Installations of the United States Army in South Vietnam
Buildings and structures in Gia Lai province